The Central District of Rasht County is a district (bakhsh) in Rasht County, Gilan Province, Iran. At the 2006 census, its population was 624,507, in 180,185 families.  The District has one city: Rasht. The District has four rural districts (dehestan): Howmeh Rural District, Lakan Rural District, Pasikhan Rural District, and Pir Bazar Rural District.

References 

Rasht County
Districts of Gilan Province